Getapnia may refer to:
Geghanist (disambiguation), several places in Armenia
Getapnya, Armenia